Nakim Youssoufa (born 14 September 1993) is a Comorian international footballer who plays for French club Gardanne, as a right back.

Career
Born in Marseille, Youssoufa has played for Côte Bleue, Barletta, Triestina and Gardanne.

He made his international debut for Comoros in 2014.

References

1993 births
Living people
Comorian footballers
Comoros international footballers
French footballers
French sportspeople of Comorian descent
A.S.D. Barletta 1922 players
U.S. Triestina Calcio 1918 players
AS Gardanne players
Association football fullbacks
French expatriate footballers
French expatriate sportspeople in Italy
Comorian expatriate footballers
Comorian expatriate sportspeople in Italy
Expatriate footballers in Italy